Scripps Canyon is a narrow underwater gorge located in the Pacific Ocean off the coast of southern California, United States.

It is located near the Scripps Institution of Oceanography, a major oceanographic research institution, and as a result is one of the best-studied underwater canyons. Scripps Canyon is also a popular site for recreational divers, because of its vertical walls and high density of marine life.

External links
Brueggeman, P. La Jolla Canyon and Scripps Canyon Bibliography. Scripps Institution of Oceanography Library. 2009.

Canyons and gorges of California
Submarine canyons of the Pacific Ocean
Scripps Institution of Oceanography